Thomas Michael Hoare (17 March 1919 – 2 February 2020), known as Mad Mike Hoare, was a British mercenary soldier who operated during the Simba rebellion, and attempted to conduct a coup d'état in the Seychelles.

Early life and military career
Hoare was born on Saint Patrick's Day in Calcutta to Irish parents. His father was a river pilot. At the age of eight he was sent to school in England to Margate College and then commenced training in accountancy and, as he was not able to go to Sandhurst, he joined the Territorial Army. Hoare's childhood hero was Sir Francis Drake. Aged 20 he joined the London Irish Rifles at the outbreak of the Second World War, later he then joined the 2nd Reconnaissance Regiment of the Royal Armoured Corps as a 2nd lieutenant and fought in the Arakan Campaign in Burma and at the Battle of Kohima in India. He was promoted to the rank of major. In 1945, he married Elizabeth Stott in New Delhi, by whom he had three children. A short man, Hoare was described by those who knew him as "dapper" and "charming".

After the war, he completed his training as a chartered accountant, qualifying in 1948. Hoare found life in London boring and decided to move to South Africa. He subsequently emigrated to Durban, Natal Province in the Union of South Africa where he later ran safaris and became a soldier-for-hire in various African countries. In Durban, Hoare was restless and sought adventures by marathon walking, riding a motorcycle from Cape Town to Cairo and seeking the rumoured Lost City of the Kalahari in the Kalahari desert. By the early 1960s, Hoare was extremely bored with his life as an accountant, and yearned to return to the life of a soldier, leading to his interest in becoming a mercenary.

Congo Crisis (1961–65) 
Hoare led two separate mercenary groups during the Congo Crisis.

Katanga 
Hoare's first mercenary action was in 1961 in Katanga, a province trying to break away from the newly independent Republic of the Congo. His unit was called "4 Commando". Hoare relished the macho camaraderie and the chaos of war, telling one journalist "you can't win a war with choirboys".

During this time he married Phyllis Sims, an airline stewardess.

Simba rebellion 
In 1964, Congolese Prime Minister Moïse Tshombe, his employer in Katanga, hired Hoare to lead a military unit called 5 Commando, Armée Nationale Congolaise 5 Commando (later led by John Peters; not to be confused with No.5 Commando, the British Second World War commando force) made up of about 300 men, most of whom were from South Africa. His second-in-command was a fellow ex-British Army officer, Commandant Alistair Wicks. The unit's mission was to fight a revolt known as the Simba rebellion. Tshombe distrusted General Joseph-Désiré Mobutu, the commander of the Armée Nationale Congolaise who had already carried out two coups, and preferred to keep the Congolese Army weak even in the face of the Simba rebellion. Hence, Tshombe turned to mercenaries who had already fought for him in Katanga to provide a professional military force.

To recruit his force, Hoare placed newspaper ads in Johannesburg and Salisbury (modern Harare, Zimbabwe) calling upon physically fit white men capable of marching 20 miles per day who were fond of combat and were "tremendous romantics" to join 5 Commando. The moniker Mad Mike which was given to him by the British press suggested a "wildman" leader, but in fact Hoare was a very strict leader who insisted the men of 5 Commando always be clean-shaven, keep their hair cut short, never swear and attend church services every Sunday. The men of 5 Commando were entirely white and consisted of a "ragbag of misfits" upon whom he imposed stern discipline. 5 Commando was a mixture of South Africans, Rhodesians, British, Belgians, and Germans, the last of whom were mostly Second World War veterans who had arrived in the Congo wearing Iron Crosses. Racist views towards blacks were very common in 5 Commando, but in press interviews, Hoare denied allegations of atrocities against the Congolese.  

To the press, Hoare insisted that the 5 Commando were not mercenaries, but rather "volunteers" who were waging an idealistic struggle against Communism in the Congo. Tshombe paid the men of 5 Commando a sum of money equal to $1,100 U.S dollars per month. Hoare always argued that he was a "romantic" who was fighting in the Congo for martial "glory", and insisted that for him the money was irrelevant. Whatever may have been Hoare's motivation, his men showed rapacious greed in the Congo, being noted for their looting and a tendency to steal equipment from the United Nations forces in the Congo. Reflecting his pride in his Irish heritage, Hoare adopted a flying goose as the symbol of 5 Commando and called his men the Wild Geese after the famous Irish soldiers who fought for the Stuarts in exile in the 17th and 18th centuries. Hoare was known for coolness and courage under fire as he believed that the best way to inspire his men, some of whom wilted under fire, was to lead from the front. He crushed a mutiny in his commandoes by pistol-whipping the leader of the mutiny.

Hoare led his men south and then turned north in a swiftly moving offensive, supported with aircraft flown by Cuban emigres. A particular specialty for Hoare was hijacking boats to take up the Congo river as he set about rescuing hostages from the Simbas. The Simbas were badly disciplined, poorly trained, and often not armed with modern weapons, and for all these reasons, the well-armed, -trained, and -disciplined 5 Commando had a shattering impact on the Simba rebellion. The British journalist A.J. Venter who covered the Congo crisis wrote as Hoare advanced, "the fighting grew progressively more brutal" with few prisoners taken. Hoare's advance was aided by the fact that the roads in the Congo left over from Belgian colonial rule were still usable in 1964-65. Hoare's men tended to collect the heads of Simbas and stick them to the sides of their jeeps.   

Later Hoare and his mercenaries worked in concert with Belgian paratroopers, Cuban exile pilots, and CIA-hired mercenaries who attempted to save 1,600 civilians (mostly Europeans and missionaries) in Stanleyville (modern Kisangani, Congo) from the Simba rebels in Operation Dragon Rouge. This operation saved many lives. Hoare and the 5 Commando are estimated to have saved the lives of 2,000 Europeans taken hostage by the Simbas, which made him famous around the world. Many of the hostages had been so badly treated as to barely resemble humans, which added to the fame of Hoare, who was presented in the Western press as a hero. He wrote about Stanleyville under the Simbas: "The mayor of Stanleyville, Sylvere Bondekwe, a greatly respected and powerful man, was forced to stand naked before a frenzied crowd of Simbas while one of them cut out his liver." About Operation Dragon Rouge, he wrote: "Taking Stanleyville was the greatest achievement of the Wild Geese. There is only so much 300 men can do, but here we were, part of a very big push and clearing the rebels out of Stan was a major victory for our side." Hoare did not stop his men from sacking Stanleyville as the 5 Commando blew up the vaults of every bank and cleared out the alcohol in every bar in the city.

Hoare was later promoted to lieutenant-colonel in the Armée Nationale Congolaise and 5 Commando expanded into a two-battalion force. Hoare commanded 5 Commando from July 1964 to November 1965. After completing his service, he told the media that he estimated that 5 Commando had killed between 5,000-10,000 Simbas. The Simbas had been advised by Cuban officers, and one of them was the Argentine Communist revolutionary Ernesto "Che" Guevara, which led to Hoare to claim he was the first man to have defeated Che Guevara.   

Speaking on the conflict, he said, "I had wanted nothing so much as to have 5 Commando known as an integral part of the ANC, a 5 Commando destined to strike a blow to rid the Congo of the greatest cancer the world has ever known—the creeping, insidious disease of communism". 

Later, Hoare wrote his own account of 5 Commando's role in the 1960s Congo mercenary war, originally titled Congo Mercenary and much later repeatedly republished in paperback simply as Mercenary (subtitled "The Classic Account of Mercenary Warfare"). The exploits of Hoare and 5 Commando in the Congo were much celebrated for decades afterward and helped contribute significantly to the glorification of the mercenary lifestyle in magazines such as Soldier of Fortune together with countless pulp novels that featured heroes clearly modeled after Hoare. The popular image of mercenaries fighting in Africa in the 1960s to the present is that of a macho adventurers defiantly living life on their own terms together with much drinking and womanizing mixed in with hair-raising adventures.

The Wild Geese
In the mid-1970s, Hoare was hired as technical adviser for the film The Wild Geese, the fictional story of a group of mercenary soldiers hired to rescue a deposed African president who resembled Tshombe while the central African nation the story was set in resembled the Congo. The character "Colonel Allen Faulkner" (played by Richard Burton) was modelled on Hoare. At least one of the actors in the film, Ian Yule, had been a mercenary under Hoare's command, before which he had served in the British Parachute Regiment and Special Air Service (SAS). Of the actors playing mercenaries, four were born in Africa, two were former POWs, and most had received military training.

In an interview, Hoare praised The Wild Geese as an authentic picture of the mercenary lifestyle in Africa saying: "In a good mercenary outfit, they're all there because they want to be. All right, the motive is probably the high money they earn, but they all want to do it. They're all volunteers". The film's message that Africa needed pro-Western leaders like Tshombe and that mercenaries who fought for such leaders were heroes seemed to reflect Hoare's influence.

Seychelles affair (1981) and subsequent conviction

Background 
In 1978, Seychelles exiles in South Africa, acting on behalf of ex-president James Mancham, discussed with South African Government officials launching a coup d'état against the new president France-Albert René, who had "promoted" himself from prime minister while Mancham was out of the country. The coup was seen favorably by some in Washington, D.C., due to the United States' concerns over access to its new military base on Diego Garcia island, the necessity to move operations from the Seychelles to Diego Garcia, and the determination that René was not someone who would be in favour of the United States.

Preparation 
Associates of Mancham contacted Hoare, then in South Africa as a civilian resident, who eventually raised a force of about 55 men including ex-South African Special Forces (Recces), former Rhodesian soldiers, and ex-Congo mercenaries.

Now in November 1981, Hoare dubbed them "Ye Ancient Order of Froth Blowers" (AOFB) after a charitable English social club of the 1920s. In order for the plan to work, he disguised the mercenaries as a rugby club, and hid AK-47s in the bottom of their luggage, as he explained in his book The Seychelles Affair:

We were a Johannesburg beer-drinking club. We met formally once a week in our favourite pub in Braamfontein. We played Rugby. Once a year we organised a holiday for our members. We obtained special charter rates. Last year we went to Mauritius. In the best traditions of the original AOFB we collected toys for underprivileged kids and distributed them to orphanages ... I made sure the toys were as bulky as possible and weighed little. Rugger footballs were ideal. These were packed in the special baggage above the false bottom to compensate for the weight of the weapon.

Fighting 
The fighting started prematurely when one of Hoare's men accidentally got into the "something to declare" line at which the customs officer insisted on searching his bag. The rifles were well-concealed in the false-bottomed kitbags; however, one rifle was found and a customs officer sounded the alarm. One of Hoare's men pulled his own, disassembled AK-47 from the concealed compartment in the luggage, assembled it, loaded it and shot the escaping customs man before he could reach the other side of the building. 

The plan for the coup proceeded despite this set-back with one team of Hoare's men attempting to capture a barracks. Fighting ensued at the airport and in the middle of this, an Air India jet (Flight 224) landed at the airport, damaging a flap on one of the trucks strewn on the runway. Hoare managed to negotiate a ceasefire before the aircraft and passengers were caught in the crossfire. After several hours, the mercenaries found themselves in an unfavorable position where some wanted to depart on the aircraft, which needed fuel. Hoare conceded and the captain of the aircraft allowed them on board after Hoare had found fuel for the aircraft. 

On board, Hoare asked the captain why he had landed when he had been informed of the fighting taking place, to which the pilot responded once the aircraft had started to descend he did not have enough fuel to climb the aircraft back to cruising altitude and still make his destination. Hoare's men still had their weapons and Hoare asked the captain if he would allow the door to be opened so they could ditch the weapons over the sea before they returned to South Africa, but the captain laughed at Hoare's out-of-date knowledge on how pressurized aircraft functioned, telling him it would not be at all possible.

Investigation and trial 
Six of the mercenary soldiers stayed behind on the islands; four were convicted of treason in the Seychelles.

In January 1982 an International Commission, appointed by the United Nations Security Council in Resolution 496, inquired into the attempted coup d'état. The UN report concluded that South African defence agencies were involved, including supplying weapons and ammunition.

Being associated with the South African security services, the hijackers were initially charged with kidnapping, which carries no minimum sentence, but this was upgraded to hijacking after international pressure.

Hoare was found guilty of aeroplane hijacking and sentenced to ten years in prison. In total, 42 of the 43 alleged hijackers were convicted. One of the mercenaries, an American veteran of the Vietnam War, was found not guilty of hijacking, as he had been seriously wounded in the firefight and was loaded aboard while sedated. Many of the other mercenaries, including the youngest of the group, Raif St Clair, were quietly released after serving three months of their six-month terms in their own prison wing. Hoare spent 33 months in prison until released after a Christmas Presidential amnesty. During his 33 months in prison, Hoare consoled himself by memorising Shakespeare.

Aftermath 
Hoare was a chartered accountant and member of the Institute of Chartered Accountants in England and Wales. Previously the Institute had said it could not expel him despite protests from members as he had committed no offence and paid his membership dues. His imprisonment allowed the ICAEW to expel him from membership in 1983. 

Hoare's account of the Seychelles operation, The Seychelles Affair, was markedly critical of the South African establishment. In 2013, he published his seventh book, a historical novel entitled The Last Days of the Cathars about the medieval persecution of the Cathars in the south-west of France. In his last decades, Hoare had extensively studied the beliefs of the Cathars.

Personal life 
Hoare married Elizabeth Stott in New Delhi in 1945 and together they had three children, Chris, Tim and Geraldine.

He left accountancy and ran a motor car business. In 1954, he motorcycled across Africa from Cape Town to Cairo. In 1959 he set up a safari business in the Kalahari and the Okavango delta. A keen sailor, he had a yacht in Durban, then later bought a 23-metre Baltic trader called Sylvia in which he sailed the Western Mediterranean for three years with his family and wrote a book about the travels.

After divorcing in 1960, he married airline stewardess Phyllis Sims in 1961 and they had two children, Michael Jeremy and Simon.

Irish-South African novelist Bree O'Mara (1968–2010) was his niece. She wrote an account of Hoare's adventures as a mercenary in the Congo, which remained unpublished at the time of her death on Afriqiyah Airways Flight 771.

Hoare's son Chris Hoare wrote a biography on his father, titled 'Mad Mike' Hoare: The Legend.

Death
Hoare died of natural causes on 2 February 2020 in a care facility in Durban at the age of 100.

Works by Mike Hoare 
 Congo Mercenary, London: Hale (1967), ; Boulder, CO: Paladin Press (reissue 2008, with new foreword), ; Durban: Partners in Publishing (2019)
 Congo Warriors, London: Hale (1991), ; Boulder, CO: Paladin Press (reissue 2008, with new foreword, Durban: Partners in Publishing (2019); 
 The Road to Kalamata: a Congo mercenary's personal memoir, Lexington, Mass.: Lexington Books (1989), ; Boulder, CO: Paladin Press (reissue 2008, with new foreword); Durban: Partners in Publishing (2019)
 The Seychelles Affair, Bantam, ; Boulder, CO: Paladin Press (reissue 2008, with new foreword); Durban: Partners in Publishing (2019)
 Three Years with Sylvia, London: Hale, ; Boulder, CO: Paladin Press (reissue 2010, with new foreword); Durban: Partners in Publishing (2019)
 Mokoro – A Cry for Help! Durban North: Partners in Publishing (2007), 
 Mike Hoare′s Adventures in Africa, Boulder, CO: Paladin Press (2010), ; Durban: Partners in Publishing (2019)
 The Last Days of the Cathars, Durban: Partners in Publishing (2012 and 2019)

See also 
 Bob Denard
 Jean Schramme
 Simon Mann

References

Further reading 
 Kyle Burke Revolutionaries for the Right: Anticommunist Internationalism and Paramilitary Warfare in the Cold War, Chapel Hill: University of North Carolina Press, 2018, .
 Torsten Thomas/Gerhard Wiechmann: Moderne Landsknechte oder Militärspezialisten? Die "Wiedergeburt" des Söldnerwesens im 20.Jahrhundert im Kongo, 1960–1967, in: Stig Förster/Christian Jansen/Günther Kronenbitter (Hg.): Rückkehr der Condottieri? Krieg und Militär zwischen staatlichem Monopol und Privatisierung: Von der Antike bis zur Gegenwart, Paderborn u.a. 2009, pp. 265–282.
 Anthony Mockler: The new mercenaries, New York 1985.
 A.J. Venter War Dog: Fighting Other People's Wars: The Modern Mercenary in Combat, New Delhi: Lancer Publishers, 2006, .
Chris Hoare: 'Mad Mike' Hoare: The Legend, Durban: Partners in Publishing, 2018,

External links 

1919 births
2020 deaths
British accountants
British anti-communists
Reconnaissance Corps officers
British Army personnel of World War II
British centenarians
British mercenaries
British people imprisoned abroad
Democratic Republic of the Congo military personnel
Hijackers
Irish emigrants to South Africa
Irish mercenaries
Irish officers in the British Army
Men centenarians
People of the Congo Crisis
People of the State of Katanga
Prisoners and detainees of South Africa
South African mercenaries
Royal Armoured Corps officers
British people in colonial India
Military personnel of British India
London Irish Rifles soldiers
History of Seychelles